Ali Ahmet Çapraz (1911 in Kılıçköy / Nozharovo near Razgrad, Bulgaria -deceased ) is a retired Turkish wrestler with a claim to being undefeated in professional wrestling. He is known widely with the nickname Alamet Pehlivan to Turkish public and used the alias Ali Bey for his international professional wrestling career.

Early life and career
Çapraz trained in oil wrestling from a young age and immigrated to Turkey clandestinely in 1932. He was settled in Lüleburgaz and later moved to İstanbul. Çapraz had participated in prestigious Turkish tournaments such as Kırkpınar. Although a member of the Turkish national team that would later participate in the  1950 World Wrestling Championships, he was expelled due to an alleged breach of discipline. Çapraz then moved to Britain and decided to start a career in professional wrestling.

Çapraz defeated Lebanese wrestler Ali Musa at a World Heavyweight title match held in Beirut on January 31, 1948. He later travelled to many countries and was known for his feuds with Greek, French, and American wrestlers such as Karpozilos, Iliyazi, Bagras, and Kosta Natail.

Personal life
As of 2001, Çapraz and his second wife (married in 1979) were living in Bandırma where he settled after retirement. He died sometime between 2001 to 2006.

References

External links
 

1911 births
Year of death unknown
People from Razgrad Province
Turkish professional wrestlers
Turkish male sport wrestlers
Bulgarian emigrants to Turkey
Turkish centenarians
Men centenarians
Bulgarian Turks in Turkey
Stampede Wrestling alumni